Eosentomon beltrani is a species of proturan in the family Eosentomidae. It is found in Central America.

References

Eosentomon
Articles created by Qbugbot
Animals described in 1949